A transporter bridge, also known as a ferry bridge or aerial transfer bridge, is a type of movable bridge that carries a segment of roadway across a river. The gondola is slung from a tall span by wires or a metal frame. The design has been used to cross navigable rivers or other bodies of water, where there is a requirement for ship traffic to be able to pass. This has been a rare type of bridge, with fewer than two dozen built. There are just twelve that continue to be used today, including one converted into a lift bridge and one designed as, but not yet operating as, a transporter bridge.

History
The concept of the transporter bridge was invented in 1873 by Charles Smith (1844–1882), the manager of an engine works in Hartlepool, England. He called it a "bridge ferry" and unsuccessfully presented his ideas to councils in Hartlepool, Middlesbrough, and Glasgow.

The first transporter bridge, Vizcaya Bridge was built between Las Arenas and Portugalete, Spain, in 1893. The design from Alberto Palacio inspired others to attempt similar structures. The idea came about in locations where it was seen as impractical to build long approach ramps that would be required to reach a high span, and in places where ferries are not easily able to cross. Because transporter bridges can carry only a limited load, the idea was little used after the rise of the automobile.

The first such bridge built in France, the 1898 Rouen bridge crossing the Seine, was destroyed by the French Army to slow down German troops in World War II. Transporter bridges were popular in France, where five were erected and another partially completed.

The United Kingdom has four transporter bridges, though Warrington Transporter Bridge is disused and the modern Royal Victoria Dock Bridge, though designed with the potential to be used as a transporter bridge, has so far only been used as a high-level footbridge. The Newport Transporter Bridge was built in 1906 across the River Usk in Newport. Because the river banks are very low at the crossing point (a few miles south of the city centre) a traditional bridge would need a very long approach ramp and a ferry could not be used at low tide. The Newport bridge was a Ferdinand Arnodin design. The Middlesbrough Transporter Bridge opened in 1911 crossing the River Tees. It was featured in the 2002 series of the popular British TV show Auf Wiedersehen, Pet; the programme's plot had the bridge being dismantled and re-erected in Arizona, US. The Widnes-Runcorn Transporter Bridge, demolished in the early 1960s, was the first of its type in Britain, and the largest ever built.

In the United States, two such bridges were built. The first was the Aerial Bridge built in Duluth, Minnesota in 1905, although the city had originally planned to build a vertical lift bridge at the site. The transporter design was used for about 25 years before the structure was reconfigured to lift a central span in 1930.

The second American transporter bridge was different from other designs and partially resembled gondola lifts used in mountainous regions. The Sky Ride was part of the 1933–34 Chicago World's Fair ("Century of Progress"). It was taken down after two years, and was the longest bridge of this type ever built at the time.

Two historic transporter bridges survive in Germany. The bridge at Rendsburg, from 1913 is two bridges in one: a railroad link crosses on the top span, and the suspended ferry carries traffic on the valley floor. The Osten Transporter Bridge at Osten is four years older and was the first transporter bridge in Germany.

List of transporter bridges

Existing bridges

Historic bridges

See also
 Movable bridges for a list of other movable bridge types

References

External links

The Friends of Newport Transporter Bridge
BBC Article on the Middlesbrough Transporter Bridge
Warrington Transporter Bridge
BBC article on the Bridges of the River Tees
Structurae: Transporter bridges
The World of Transporter bridges 
Rochefort Transporter Bridge official website
Flying Bridges: A Short History of Transporter Bridges
 Transporter Bridges on historic postcards
 Transporter Bridges on Skyscraperpage.com

1873 introductions
British inventions
Spanish inventions
 
Bridges by structural type